The Hebrew Free Loan Society of Greater Philadelphia (HFLGP) provides interest-free loans to members of the Philadelphia Jewish community in need. Founded in 1984 as the Hebrew Free Loan Society at Beth Sholom and housed at Beth Sholom Congregation (Elkins Park, Pennsylvania), by 2006, over $2 million in loans had been granted from its revolving fund. HFLGP is a member of the International Association of Hebrew Free Loans.

HFLGP is a 501(c)(3) organization funded entirely by private donations.

General information

HFLGP offers loans of up to $7,500. Borrowers must live in the Philadelphia area, specifically Bucks, Chester, Delaware, Montgomery or Philadelphia counties in Pennsylvania, or Burlington, Camden, Gloucester or Mercer counties in New Jersey. Borrowers must be Jewish or serve the Jewish community.

Credit-worthy co-signers who live in Pennsylvania or New Jersey are required to guarantee repayment for all loans.

HFPGP lends money for many purposes, including but not limited to:

 Medical and dental bills
 Home repairs
 Apartment rental and deposits
 First home purchase closing costs
 Family member immigration
 Adoption
 Fertility treatments
 Jewish camp
 Unemployment
 Vocational and job training
 Education

Business loans
HFLGP offers interest-free loans up to $15,000 for new businesses or businesses changing their direction, though the R & B Business Loan Fund at Congregation Beth Or. Borrowers must live in the Philadelphia area, specifically Bucks, Chester, Delaware, Montgomery or Philadelphia counties in Pennsylvania, or Burlington, Camden, Gloucester or Mercer counties in New Jersey. Unlike HFLGP's personal loans, this loan program is non-sectarian.

Two credit-worthy co-signers who live in Pennsylvania or New Jersey are required to guarantee repayment for all loans.

History

Hebrew Free Loan Societies are based on the Biblical injunction "If you lend money to My people, to the poor among you, do not act towards them as a creditor; exact no interest from them." (Exodus 22:24) Jewish communities throughout history have included these organizations as one of the pillars of communal life. 

The Hebrew Free Society of Greater Philadelphia was founded in 1984 through the efforts of Rabbi Aaron Landes z"l. Bernard and Marie Granor agreed to spearhead the original effort and Bernard served as President of the Society for more than 20 years.

External links
 Hebrew Free Loan Society of Greater Philadelphia -- official website
 Hebrew Free Loan Society in the November 2008 Philadelphia Jewish Voice
 International Association of Hebrew Free Loans
 Philadelphia Inquirer article about free loan societies in Philadelphia

Microfinance organizations
Charities based in Pennsylvania
Jews and Judaism in Philadelphia
Organizations established in 1984
Jewish charities based in the United States
1984 establishments in Pennsylvania